Turps may refer:

 Turpentine, colloquially turps, distilled tree resin, used as a solvent 
 White spirit, turpentine substitute
 Ian Turpie (1943–2012), or "Turps", Australian celebrity
 Turps Banana magazine, founded in 2005 by Marcus Harvey

See also
Terp (disambiguation)
Turp (disambiguation)